Glen Lake Rotary Park is an 83-acre recreation area (formerly named East Gallatin Recreation Area) in Bozeman, Montana, United States. The lake was originally a water filled old gravel pit.

The conversion of the old gravel pit and adjacent old city landfill into a recreation area was awarded a national Take Pride in America award.

History
The East Gallatin Recreation Area began as a gravel pit and the city dump. Early photos show a steep sided water filled pit, surrounded by weeds and adjacent to an old city junk yard / landfill with  refrigerators and car parts poking out of the ground. The gravel pit land was transferred to the state parks department by Glen Hash and partners whose business owned the gravel pit and some adjacent land. The cleanup was accomplished through local donations and volunteer labor and perhaps the City.

For a number of years the area was known as the East Gallatin Recreation Area (because of the small East Gallatin River running through the east end of the Park.   
Early volunteer work was performed by local volunteers and businesses under the leadership of the volunteer group organized as the East Gallatin Recreation Area Task Force.  After about ten years the newly formed Bozeman Sunrise Rotary Club took over the volunteer leadership and has made great progress.
https://bozemansunriserotary.org/SitePage/east-gallatin-recreation-area-1

In late December of 2018 the MT Department of Fish, Wildlife and Parks gave a 50 year lease agreement to the City of Bozeman (which owns the larger grassland and river bottom park area to the east).  In that agreement the name of the area was changed to "Glen Lake Rotary Park" in honor of all the work done by the Rotary Club.  (Glen in this case does not refer to a small valley, but instead to deceased main owner of the old gravel pit, Mr. Glen Hash)

As of 2020 detailed plans have been partly accomplished to improve the roads and parking and create an additional entrance on the south side.  As of January 2023 this is still a work in progress, but the first 1/3 might be completed by the end of 2023.  Rising costs and available cash area now the main impediment. However, a new road has been made with branch stubbed in the South border of the Park, mostly due to the Parks, great neighbor Northwester Energy.  The Bozeman Sunrise Rotary Club has offered to pay $150,000 toward a projected $441,000 cost. (Potential donors can contact the Bozeman Sunrise Rotary Club)

The Bozeman Sunrise Rotary Club has made the major portion of the Parks improvements and is continuing to do so.  (Watch work on the two acre privately owned land but the new road on the north side:  old horse pasture with a small ditch becoming a park setting with a meandering stream.

These large projects have been undertaken in cooperation with the City of Bozeman, the State of Montana and surrounding property owners.  

For current information, contact the Bozeman Sunrise Rotary Club or show up at one of the club's Friday early morning weekly meetings.

References
Steve Hample - past VP of the East Gallatin Recreation Area Task Force and past president of the Bozeman Sunrise Rotary club

Glen Lake Rotary Park is an 83-acre recreation area (formerly named East Gallatin Recreation Area) in Bozeman, Montana, United States. The lake was originally a landfill site.

The conversion of the adjacent old city landfill into a recreation area was awarded a national Take Pride in America award.

History
The East Gallatin Recreation Area began as a gravel pit and the city dump. Early photos show a steep sided water filled pit, surrounded by weeds and old refrigerators and car parts poking out of the bare ground. The land was transferred to the state parks department by Glen Hash and partners whose business owned the gravel pit and some adjacent land. The cleanup was accomplished through local donations and volunteer labor.

The area is named for the East Gallatin River which forms the eastern edge of the park.

Early volunteer work was performed by local volunteers and businesses under the leadership of the volunteer group organized as the East Gallatin Recreation Area Task Force.  After about ten years the newly formed Bozeman Sunrise Rotary Club took over the volunteer leadership and has made great progress.
https://bozemansunriserotary.org/SitePage/east-gallatin-recreation-area-1

As of 2020 detailed plans have been partly accomplished to improve the roads and parking and create an additional entrance on the south side.   Also in 2020 the Bozeman Noon Rotary Club created and dedicated an additional large picnic shelter built with artistically designed steel sheets and supports. In 2021 Rotary club members will work on restoring a meandering stream on two acres at the north entrance.  Detailed engineering plans have been created to extend the gravel road in the park and expand the amount of parking areas and in doing so pave the entire project and connect to a new south entrance; however the cost is estimated at $500,000 and raising that much money may take a while.

These large projects have been undertaken in cooperation with the City of Bozeman, the State of Montana and surrounding property owners.  In December 2018 a 50-year lease was signed allowing the city to manage the lake area of the park which is on state owned land.  Part of that lease agreement called for the park to be renamed as "Glen Lake Rotary Park"

For current information, consult the website of the   Bozeman Sunrise Rotary Club   or   TripAdvisor

References

History and plans for Glen Lake Rotary Park   Bozeman Daily Chronicle    https://www.bozemandailychronicle.com/news/city/plan-calls-for-more-trails-beach-expansion-at-glen-lake/article_41a4cfa8-de22-54bd-a6e3-3e503e09581f.html

External links

Parks in Montana